Celia Maria Newman (born October 21, 1968, in San Miguel de Allende, Mexico) is an actress, sometimes credited as Cehlia Barnum. She has been in numerous feature films and appeared in the TV series Dallas in the 1980s.

Life and career
Newman is married to Texas State Senator Jose Menendez (District 26) and has been actively involved in her husband's political career. She gave birth to the couple's third child in 2007.

A relative on her father's side was actor and political satirist Will Rogers and on her mother's side showman P.T. Barnum.

Early life 
Newman attended University of The Incarnate Word and received a degree in child psychology.  While there she participated in the theater program and was directed in several student productions. These productions included Golden Boy as Lorna, directed by actor Ricardo Chavira.

Newman is of Scotch-Irish, Spanish, Cherokee and Prussian Jewish descent.

As a child, Newman was a member, of the Texas Children's Bach Choir; she studied opera for several years and was listed as a coloratura soprano.

Newman now goes by the name Cehlia Nicole Newman-Menendez.

Family 
Spouse - Jose Menéndez (9 September 1995–present)
Children - Dominic, Victoria, Austin

Filmography 
My Two Loves (1986) - Mean Cheerleader - VOC
The Legend of Billie Jean (1985) - Interview Girl - VOC
Lost Angels (1989) - Paco's Girl "Maria" - VOC

Television 
Dallas (1985) - “Charlie's friend”/gang leader's girlfriend - VOC

References

External links 

Artwork by Cehlia Newman
Newman Artista
Texas Artist Cehlia Newman-Menendez
Artist's Review
Imagekind Artists
Ny times article BLP_IMDb-only_refimprove

20th-century American actresses
Actresses from Texas
American film actresses
Artists from Texas
American jewelry designers
Mexican emigrants to the United States
University of the Incarnate Word alumni
1968 births
Living people
People from San Miguel de Allende
Actresses from Guanajuato
21st-century American women
Women jewellers